Vivek Gupta (born 1963) is an Indian-born American business leader. He is presently President and CEO (Chief Executive Officer), and Director on the Board of Mastech Digital.

Career 
After graduating from the Indian Institute of Technology, Gupta started his career with Zensar Technologies, an information technology, and infrastructure services company, in 1984.

In 1993, he moved to England to expand the company's reach across Central and Eastern Europe, the UK, and the Nordics. 

In 2001, Gupta moved to Chicago, IL to head Zensar's Global Outsourcing Services business, providing Application Portfolio Management (APM) and Business Process Outsourcing (BPO) services to global customers. Following his stint in the US, Gupta returned to India in 2009 as Zensar's Chief Operating Officer.

In November 2010, Zensar announced its acquisition of the US IT firm, Akibia Inc, and appointed Gupta as its Executive Chairman. Gupta was credited for the integration between the two diverse company cultures. As a part of his new role, he contributed to scaling the IMS (Infrastructure Management Services) business. Under his leadership, Zensar witnessed a company-wide growth since the acquisition was first announced, with 8,000 employees across 20 different locations worldwide. The company was also valued at $500 million in 2015.

In 2014, Gupta led a partnership between Zensar and the Harvard School of Business. It gave Zensar access to the Business School's cutting-edge infrastructure, and an opportunity to engage with fresh talent, namely students, through research programs.

In October 2015, after nearly 32 years with Zensar, Gupta took charge as the Chief Executive – Americas of RPG Enterprises, a $3 billion group with a presence in automotive tires, pharmaceuticals, information technology, plantations, and infrastructure, among many others. Zensar Technologies is a wholly owned subsidiary of the RPG Group.

In March 2016, Gupta joined Mastech, as its President, CEO, and Member of the Board.

Later in July 2017, Gupta led Mastech Digital's acquisition of InfoTrellis, a Canada-based data management and analytics services company. The deal was valued at $55 million. This venture strengthened the company's focus on digital transformation services.

In April 2018, Gupta expanded Mastech Digital's presence in India with a 20,000 sq. ft. office in Chennai, India. In January 2019, he further expanded the company's presence in the subcontinent with a 40,000 sq. ft. facility in Noida, India. At the same time, he also announced the company's intention to acquire more firms in line with its vision to become a digital technologies company.

Recognition 
Since his appointment as CEO and President of Mastech Digital, Gupta has ranked amongst the "100 Most Influential Leaders in Staffing Industry" by Staffing Industry Analysts for the years – 2017, 2018, 2021, and 2023.

In October 2018 and 2019, Smart Business recognized Gupta as a "Smart 50 Honoree" for his contributions to the economic success of the region of Pittsburgh.

In December 2020, he was recognized for the third consecutive year in a row for smart leadership and business transformation in 2020 Pittsburgh Smart 50.

In October 2021, he was recognized for the fourth time, among the top 50 Business Leaders in 2021 Pittsburgh Smart 50.

In January 2022, he was recognized for the World Staffing Award under Top 100 Staffing Leaders to watch in 2022.

In October 2022, he was recognized by Pittsburgh Smart 50 Awards as one of the top business leaders for his ability to effectively build and lead a successful organization.

References 

1960s births
Living people
American people of Indian descent
IIT Delhi alumni
Businesspeople from Pittsburgh